Great Fire or The Great Fire may refer to:

Fires
Great Fire of Rome (64 A.D.)
Great Fire of North Walsham (1605)
1615 Great Fire of Wymondham
Great fire of Meireki (1657)
Great Fire of London (1666)
Great Fire of Northampton (1675)
Great Fire of Warwick (1694)
Great Stockholm Fire of 1759
Great fire of Tartu (1775)
Great Fire of New York (1776)
Great New Orleans Fire (1794)
Great New Orleans Fire (1788)
Great Fire of Bedford (1802)
Great Fire of Stevenage (1807)
Great Podil fire (1811)
Great fire of Tirschenreuth (1814)
Great Fire of New York (1835)
Great fire of Hamburg (1842)
Great New York City Fire of 1845
Great Fire of Pittsburgh (1845)
Great Fire of 1846
Great Fire of Toronto (1849)
Great Fire of 1852
Great fire of Newcastle and Gateshead (1854)
Great fire of Brisbane (1864)
1866 great fire of Portland, Maine
Great Fire of Whitstable, 1869
Great Chicago Fire (1871)
Great Michigan Fire (1871)
Great Boston Fire of 1872
1877 Great Fire of Saint John, New Brunswick
Great Vancouver Fire (1886)
Great Seattle Fire (1889)
Great Fire of Toronto (1904)
Great Fire of 1910
Great Thessaloniki Fire of 1917
Great fire of Smyrna (1922)
Second Great Fire of London (1940)
Great Fire of Valparaíso (2014)

Other uses
The Great Fire (album), a 2012 album by Bleeding Through
The Great Fire (Murphy novel), a 1995 novel by Jim Murphy about the Great Chicago Fire
The Great Fire (TV series), a 2014 drama about the Great Fire of London
The Great Fire (Hazzard novel), a 2003 novel by Shirley Hazzard
The Great Fire (Vanity Fair), September 2020 issue of Vanity Fair guest-edited by Ta-Nehisi Coates and dedicated to topics of racial justice
GreatFire, a non-profit organization monitoring internet censorship in China
"Great Fire", a song by XTC from Mummer

See also
List of fires